The 2017 Asia Rugby Women's Championship was from 8th – 15th July. The first round was hosted by Japan and Hong Kong the second round. Japan claimed the championship after defeating Hong Kong.

Table

Results

Round 1

Round 2

References 

2017 in Asian rugby union
2017 in women's rugby union
Asia Rugby Women's Championship